Mark Nixon may refer to:

 Mark Nixon (rugby league) (born 1968), New Zealand rugby league footballer
 Mark Nixon (academic)  (born 1958), British academic